Yaesu Chikagai or Yaesu Shopping Mall is a large underground shopping mall located in Yaesu, Chūō, Tokyo, Japan.

Yaesu Chikagai lies underneath Yaesu Avenue and Sotobori Dori. It is immediately adjacent to the Yaesu side of Tokyo Station, with direct connections into the basement level of the station.

The mall contains about 180 shops, including 60 restaurants and cafes.

Nearby attractions
Ramen Street
Shangri-La Hotel, Tokyo
Daimaru, Tokyo

References

Buildings and structures in Chūō, Tokyo
Shopping centres in Japan